Boyd Owen Bartley (February 11, 1920 – December 21, 2012) was a Major League Baseball player. He played shortstop for the Brooklyn Dodgers in nine games during the 1943 Brooklyn Dodgers season. He was born in Chicago. He served in the military during World War II.

References

External links

1920 births
2012 deaths
Baseball players from Chicago
Brooklyn Dodgers players
Hyde Park Academy High School alumni
Illinois Fighting Illini baseball players
Los Angeles Dodgers scouts
Major League Baseball shortstops
Minor league baseball managers
Montreal Royals players
Ponca City Dodgers players
People from Hurst, Texas